The Tuscumbia River is a  tributary of the Hatchie River in northern Mississippi and western Tennessee in the United States. It rises in Prentiss County, Mississippi, near Booneville. It flows through Alcorn County, then into McNairy County, Tennessee, where it is joined by a major tributary, Cypress Creek, and then flows into the Hatchie River, just before it reaches Hardeman County, near Pocahontas, Tennessee.

Tuscumbia is a name derived from the Chickasaw language purported to mean either "warrior killer" or "warrior rainmaker".

See also
List of rivers of Mississippi
List of rivers of Tennessee

References

Rivers of Mississippi
Rivers of Tennessee
Bodies of water of Prentiss County, Mississippi
Bodies of water of Alcorn County, Mississippi
Bodies of water of McNairy County, Tennessee
Bodies of water of Hardeman County, Tennessee
Tennessee placenames of Native American origin
Mississippi placenames of Native American origin